Four ships of the British Royal Navy have been named HMS Hotspur after the nickname of Sir Henry Percy:

 , a 36-gun fifth rate in service from 1810 to 1821
 , a 46-gun fifth rate launched in 1828, a chapel hulk after 1859, renamed Monmouth in 1868, and sold in 1902
 , an armoured ram launched in 1870 and sold in 1904
 , an  launched in 1936 and transferred to the Dominican Republic in 1948

Fictional ships
 A sloop called Hotspur, armed with twenty 9-pounder cannon and four carronades, appears in the Horatio Hornblower novel, Hornblower and the Hotspur, third in the series
 A Hotspur appears in Sir Arthur Conan Doyle's short story The Adventure of the Gloria Scott
 A schooner called Hotspur appears in the Richard Bolitho novel A Band of Brothers, written by Douglas Reeman (using the pseudonym Alexander Kent).
 A destroyer called Hotspur appears in the Honor Harrington novel The Short Victorious War written by David Weber

Royal Navy ship names